The X's is an American animated television series created by Carlos Ramos for Nickelodeon. The series centers on a family of spies who must conceal their identity from the outside world, but often have trouble in doing so. It had a single season of 20 episodes (1 unaired) airing from November 25, 2005, to November 25, 2006. Although it was compared to The Incredibles and Alias, Ramos has stated that the show takes inspiration from the James Bond film series, the 1960s TV series Get Smart, and the 1960s TV series The Avengers.

Synopsis
The X's work for SUPERIOR. Mr. and Mrs. X have their daughter named Tuesday, their younger son named Truman and many gadgets at their disposal. An organization called S.N.A.F.U. (short for Society of Nefarious and Felonious Undertakings) is continually trying to cause trouble for the X's through their plans to take over the world.

Characters

Superior
 Mr. X (voiced by Patrick Warburton) – Family patriarch, team leader of the X's, and the main protagonist of the series. Tucker is the expert at hand-to-hand combat and is similar to James Bond and Maxwell Smart. Although he is a competent spy, he struggles with many everyday issues such as remembering his name. He is also an excellent cook and is a very strict and stern person. In one episode, his shoe phone self-destructed as a parody of both Get Smart and Mission Impossible. Mr. X is 40 years old.
 Mrs. X (voiced by Wendie Malick) – Second in command and combat specialist of the X's. Mrs. X is fully trained in hand-to-hand combat and martial arts, but she is a horrible cook. She is an expert at tennis. Mrs. X is known for administering savage beatings to Glowface. She's a very caring and protective mother to Tuesday and Truman. Mrs. X is 38 years old.
 Tuesday X (voiced by Lynsey Bartilson) is Mr. and Mrs. X's teenage daughter and missions investigator. Tuesday is the most normal of the team, despite her rather extreme punk-rock garb and frequently changing hair-color. She is also the most knowledgeable of "real-world" behavior, which the other family members either misunderstand or ignore outright. She definitely takes after her mother in savagery and fighting skills, but at heart Tuesday is a genuine teenager who wants to do other things besides spy missions with her family. She easily gets annoyed with Truman for making fun of the size of her huge butt, despite that, she behaves like a caring sister like in the episode "You Only Sneeze Twice" when Truman's look-alike robot was about to explode, she became worried and in another episode "From Crusha With Love" she guided Truman with his date by advising him. In the episode “X Take A Holiday” it's revealed that Tuesday is 16 years-old.
 Truman X (voiced by Jansen Panettiere) is Mr. and Mrs. X's son and technology expert. Truman is the smartest of all the X's. His radiation "experiments" cause so many "meltdowns" that the local Decontamination Squad are on a first name basis with the "X"s. The enfant terrible of the "X"s, Truman can sometimes be a nuisance and make trouble. Truman is 10 years old.
 Rex X (vocal effects provided by Dee Bradley Baker) is Truman's dog he got on his 9th birthday from Sasquatch. Rex was meant to kill Truman with Sasquatch controlling Rex with his mind-controlling roar, but after Truman wouldn't fight him because he thought he would finally have the perfect birthday with him and Truman told about all the good times they had. After those words, Rex broke free from the mind control and also all the other animals. Later, Rex became an honorary member for SUPERIOR. His first appearance was in "Boy's Best Fiend" and has since appeared in other episodes such as "To Err Is Truman".
 Home Base (voiced by Stephen Root) describes itself in the title sequence of The X's as "the house they live in", but Home Base is most likely the name for the computerized brain that runs the functions of their house (neither Mr. X nor Mrs. X appear to be competent about household chores, though Mr. X can mow the grass). Home Base serves as advisor, SUPERIOR contact and mission alert for the X's, and can be contacted from the X-Jet. It also serves as the (somewhat beleaguered) voice of reason in the family. Seen from above, Home Base is shaped like an X. He is visually similar to HAL 9000 from Stanley Kubrick's 2001: A Space Odyssey.

Villains
 S.N.A.F.U. – Short for Society of Nefarious and Felonious Undertakings, S.N.A.F.U. is an evil organization that the X's fight.
 Glowface (voiced by Chris Hardwick) is the X's' archenemy, the leader of S.N.A.F.U., and the main villain of the series. Glowface's head is encased in a glass globe with electrical discharges. He wears a rubber suit and gloves to contain his vast energies. His schemes to get rid of the X's include having Mrs. X break her leg on a coffee table and sending them coupons for family portraits. Like traditional evil villains, Glowface is megalomaniacal, arrogant, psychotic, loudmouthed, and delusional, but he possesses little sophistication or maturity, and believes himself to be much more of a threat than he actually is. Similar to Dr. Evil from Austin Powers, Doctor Claw from Inspector Gadget, Satan from South Park, Dr. Drakken from Kim Possible, Vito Corleone from  The Godfather and Ernst Stavro Blofeld from the James Bond series, he also tends to think up idiotic evil schemes like building a giant ray gun in order to bring the Eiffel Tower and Big Ben to life in order for them to wrestle so he can sell tickets. He has very poor teeth and once had to get braces. Glowface is disdainful of the crush his nephew Brandon has on Tuesday. Glowface is also allergic to Zucchini and has an unseen way of eating food. The only thing that Glowface and Tucker have in common are building model train sets.
 Lorenzo Suave (voiced by Tom Kane) – Glowface's right-hand man and butler. Lorenzo seems to be an amalgam of all the villainous second-in-command spy clichés. He is stylishly and impeccably dressed with a mustache, goatee, a scar along one cheek and both an eyepatch and a monocle. Lorenzo is much more intelligent than Glowface and sometimes has to maneuver him into completing his plans when Glowface begins one of his rants. Though he is human, Lorenzo is most likely S.N.A.F.U.'s mirror to Home Base. He becomes upset when Glowface claims, after he took off his horrid disguise and introduced himself, that no one cares. He along with the S.N.A.F.U. minions are the most commonly appeared S.N.A.F.U. workers of Glowface. One time when Glowface was sick alongside the other S.N.A.F.U. agents, Lorenzo proved to be a better villain than Glowface or any of the others members of S.N.A.F.U. Just as "Glowface" is similar to Dr. Evil, Suave resembles Dr. Evil's Number #2 who actually makes his evil organization work. As Tuesday X is the most normal of the X heroines, Suave is the most normal of the S.N.A.F.U. members.
 Sasquatch (voiced by Randy Savage) appears to be an unspecified and scary man-beast and has a roar that can hypnotize or brainwash animals to do his bidding. He is probably the strongest member of S.N.A.F.U. His goal is to return the animals to their rightful place as masters of the planet. He continuously refers to himself in the third person like when he does his usual catchphrase "Sasquatch is the mightiest of all!" before making another comment.
 Brandon (voiced by Jason Schwartzman in "The Spy Who Liked Me", later voiced by David Hornsby) – Glowface's nephew. Brandon is a very nice, handsome and even somewhat gallant teenage boy, but unfortunately, he's working with his uncle as an intern for S.N.A.F.U. He has a crush on Tuesday and the two date (even planning dates in the midst of a battle) much to the dismay of both the X's (who don't much like the idea of Tuesday dating in general) and Glowface (who doesn't like the idea of Brandon dating the daughter of his nemesis at all). Mr. and Mrs. X are fairly open-minded about the relationship; on the other hand, Glowface teases Brandon about his new girlfriend whenever possible. He tends to treat his uncle's plans with either disdain or apathy, and never really acts as a villain.
 The Scream Queens are a duo of Banshee-esqe cheerleaders with a sonic boom screech. They have various cameos throughout the series.
 The McVampires are a family of hillbilly vampires. They are most likely a parody of the infamous hillbillies the McCoys. The family only appears in "Photo Ops."
 Bio-Harold – a buff guy in a hazmat suit. He only appears in "Photo Ops" and "Homebody."
 Missing Link – Missing Link is a dirty guy who looks like a Common chimpanzee/human hybrid. He only appears in "Photo Ops."
 Some Old Guy (voiced by Tom Kane) is an old man. He isn't actually a real member of S.N.A.F.U. (he just thought that the photo shop where Glowface tricked the X's was the nickel store). He frequently appears as a joke with the rest of the S.N.A.F.U. agents when Glowface introduces all the S.N.A.F.U. agents present in a battle. His voice volume and dramatic tone increase with each name coming to conclusion with the most dramatic introduction being that of "Some Old Guy".
 S.N.A.F.U. Minions (voiced by Carlos Ramos) are Glowface's Minions and foot-soldiers of S.N.A.F.U. They wear uniforms with their heads encased in globes. Their faces are never seen, but the silhouettes of their heads are seen in those globes. They have their birthdays celebrated each month on a day called "Cake Day" for any foot soldiers who have their birthday in that month.
 Copperhead (voiced by Tom Kenny) - Half-man, half-machine. Unlike Glowface, he never stays in one place for long. It was never actually revealed that he is part of S.N.A.F.U. or not, but he is "The most evil of all evil spies". He has power over magnetism (like that of Magneto in X-Men), but he runs on a large battery in his back.

Minor
 Kimla Meeks (voiced by Ashley Johnson) is Tuesday's 1st friend appeared in "A Truman Scorned", "Theater of War" and "License to Slumber". She is a huge fan of science fiction and is also very knowledgeable about sci-fi movies, comics, etc. Kimla also seems to be somewhat naive as she didn't notice Truman's crush on her and that the X's are spies despite her being presented with proof. She appears to have started talking to Tuesday more after their slumber party as they worked together on a school project later in "A Truman Scorned." A running joke throughout the series involves Kimla's "intergalactic chanting."
 Skipper Swenson (voiced by Lindsay Sloane) is Tuesday's 2nd friend appeared in "License to Slumber". Skipper is generally stuck-up and is rude to Tuesday. She doesn't like Tuesday very much and only came to her slumber party because Trudy apparently promised to pay her fifty dollars. Skipper is very popular and is also shown to have an interest in beauty and boys.
 Annasthesia Montiho (voiced by Soleil Moon Frye) is Tuesday's 3rd friend appeared in "License To Slumber". She is a goth girl and notices the strange occurrences at Tuesday's slumber party. She also likes to talk about boys.
 Wally (voiced by Tom Kenny) is a friendly neighbor of the X's. He is a devoted father with a wife and child. Wally is very nice to the X's when ever he sees them. While he's suspicious of the X's at times, he never catches on that they are spies. Wally first appeared in "Mr. Fix It," and has made appearances in "Mock Tutors," "Y's Up," and "Live and Let Diaper." Although his name is never mentioned in the series, it is listed as Wally in the credits of episodes that featured him.
 Mother (voiced by April Winchell)
 Reaper Kid (voiced by Paul Butcher)
 Miguel (voiced by Paco Jimenez, later in Flaco Jiminez)
 Nita (voiced by Andrea Zafra)
 The Y's – The Ys', or "Y's Guys" (wise guys) known by The X's. They are of Indian descent. They are also spies, but better. They are The X's rival family, even though once they gave them a cappuccino maker. The Y's once wanted to force The X's to give up their job as SUPERIOR agents so they could be replaced by them. They too have a computerized brain that runs their house, but is more sophisticated than Home Base. One of their fans is Glowface.
 Mr. Y (voiced by Ronobir Lahiri) – Similar to Mr. X.
 Mrs. Y (voiced by Susan Pari) – Similar to Mrs. X.
 Seven Y (voiced by Soleil Moon Frye) – Similar to Tuesday.
 Scout Y (voiced by Laura Marano) – Similar to Truman, but is a girl instead of a boy.
 The Z's are of Australian descent. The Z's are destroyed by the Y's. Truman stated that SUPERIOR said that their death was an accident, but the Y's hinted that their death was no mere accident, but was caused by the Y's.

Episodes

Broadcast
The series aired on Nickelodeon and premiered in the United States on November 25, 2005. The final episode aired on November 25, 2006, when the series was cancelled after one season, leaving one episode unaired.

Home media
While the series never saw any complete series releases, there were two Nick Picks volumes each that included an episode.

Awards

References

External links
 
 The X's at NickAnimationStudio.com (archive)

See Also
 Spy × Family - Japanese Animated Series also about a family of spies

2000s American animated television series
2000s American comic science fiction television series
2000s Nickelodeon original programming
2005 American television series debuts
2006 American television series endings
American children's animated action television series
American children's animated adventure television series
American children's animated comic science fiction television series
American children's animated science fantasy television series
Anime-influenced Western animated television series
English-language television shows
Fictional secret agents and spies
Nicktoons
Animated television series about families
Animated television series about siblings
Espionage television series
Television shows set in Ohio